The 1975 Formula 750 season was the third season of the FIM Formula 750 Prize. The series consisted of 17 races held at nine events. Jack Findlay won the series although he didn't win any races.

Calendar

Notes:
1. - The Daytona 200 was run as a single race rather than the aggregate of two heats that the other races used.

Points system
All events except Daytona consisted of two races and points were awarded by aggregate times of the two: 

Only the five best results achieved by a rider counted towards the championship standings.

Championship standings

See also
 1975 Grand Prix motorcycle racing season

References

Formula 750
1975 in motorcycle sport